Kayrak is a village in Gülnar district of  Mersin Province, Turkey. At  it is situated on the road connecting Gülnar to Mersin. The population of Kayrak is 704 as of 2012. The  present population of the village is composed of Turks who settled in the village in 1800s. But nearby ruins of a castle imply that other peoples also existed in the Middle Age .

References

Villages in Gülnar District